Lebrija is a town and municipality in the Santander Department in northeastern Colombia.

See also 

 Lebrija River

References

Municipalities of Santander Department